Tatiana Mollmann (born February 1, 1983 in Santa Monica, California, United States) is an American professional dancer and has acted and performed on  TV shows such as  Star Search, 30 Seconds to Fame (won first place) and Good Morning America won “best dance couple” competitive dancer.  She has her own dance shoe line of JT swing shoes.

Life & career
Tatiana Mollmann was born to a Russian/Italian mother and German father. As a child, she studied gymnastics  and West Coast Swing. She studied briefly at California State University, Long Beach.

She partnered with Parker Dearborn from 1996 to 1997 and with Shiloh Warren from 1998 to 1999. From 2000 to 2023 her partnership with Jordan Frisbee has resulted in several championship awards. They have won 11 West Coast Swing Classic Division Championships. At the UCWDC Worlds event they were given the Star Award for the Couple with the Most Impact on Swing and Frisbee won Best Swing Choreographer.

Mollmann and Frisbee have won Fox TV's "30 Seconds to Fame", appeared twice on CBS TV's "Star Search", danced in the motion picture "The Polar Express", won "America's Best Dance Couple" on ABC TV's "Good Morning America", had speaking roles and danced in the movie "Love N' Dancing". 
They are certified teachers in the Golden State Dance Teachers Association.

Awards
(with Jordan Frisbee) 
 US OPEN Young Adult Champions (2000)
 US OPEN Classic Champions (2001, 2004, 2005, 2006, 2008, 2009, 2011, 2012, 2013, 2014, 2015) - Youngest couple to win (2001)
 Dallas Dance Classic Champions (2003, 2004, 2005, 2006, 2007, 2008)
 USA Grand Nationals Classic Champions (2004, 2005, 2006, 2008, 2009)
 UCWDC World Swing Invitational Champions (2003)
 UCWDC Swing "Impact Dancers of the Year" (2003)
 USA Swing Net "Dance Couple of the Year" (2003, 2004, 2005, 2006, 2007)

References

External links
 Jordan & Tatiana's Official Website
 USA Swing Dance Network
 USA Swing Dance Network - Jordan & Tatiana Bio

1983 births
Living people
American female dancers
American dancers
People from Santa Monica, California
American people of German descent
American people of Italian descent
American people of Russian descent
21st-century American women